The following is an episode list of Mile High television drama series.

Series 1 (2003)

Series 2 (2004–2005)

Series 3 (2004–2005)
The series was later combined with Series 2.

Mile High